The TMA-4 is a circular plastic cased Yugoslavian minimum metal anti-tank blast mine. It is a modernized version of the TMA-3. The mine is basically a cast block of TNT with three fuze wells cut into it, encased in plastic. Three black plastic UTMA-4 fuzes are installed into the top surface of the mine. A thin rope carry handle is also provided. The small pressure plate area of the fuzes make the mine resistant to overpressure from explosive demining techniques. Additionally the low metal content of the mine make it very difficult to detect. Although no secondary fuze well is provided, it is possible that the mine could be fitted with improvised anti-handling devices. 

The mine is found in Albania, Angola, Bosnia, Chad, Croatia, Kosovo, Lebanon, Namibia, Sudan, and Western Sahara.

Specifications
 Diameter: 284 mm
 Height (with fuse): 110 mm
 Weight: 6 kg
 Explosive content: 5.5 kg of TNT
 Operating pressure: 100 to 200 kg

References
 Jane's Mines and Mine Clearance 2005-2005
 

Anti-tank mines
Land mines of Yugoslavia